The Varna culture is a Chalcolithic culture of northeastern Bulgaria, dated ca. 4500 BC, contemporary and closely related with the Gumelnița culture in southern Romania, often considered as local variants. 

It is characterized by polychrome pottery and rich cemeteries, the most famous of which are Varna Necropolis, the eponymous site, and the Durankulak complex, which comprises the largest prehistoric cemetery in southeastern Europe, with an adjoining coeval Neolithic settlement (published) and an unpublished and incompletely excavated Chalcolithic settlement. 294 graves have been found in the necropolis, many containing sophisticated examples of copper and gold metallurgy, pottery (about 600 pieces, including gold-painted ones), high-quality flint and obsidian blades, beads, and shells. The site was accidentally discovered in October 1972 by excavator operator Raycho Marinov. Research excavation was under the direction of Mihail Lazarov and Ivan Ivanov. About 30% of the estimated necropolis area is still not excavated.

The findings showed that the Varna culture had trade relations with distant lands, possibly including the lower Volga region and the Cyclades, perhaps exporting metal goods and salt from the Solnitsata rock salt mine. The copper ore used in the artifacts originated from a Sredna Gora mine near Stara Zagora, and Mediterranean spondylus shells found in the graves may have served as primitive currency.

Burial rites 

Graves of the Varna Necropolis contained the oldest known examples of gold working in the world. Burials included both crouched and extended inhumations. Some graves did not contain a skeleton, only grave gifts (cenotaphs). These symbolic (empty) graves are the richest in gold artifacts. 3000 gold artifacts were found, with a weight of approximately 6 kilograms. Three symbolic graves also contained masks of unfired clay.

Religion 

The Varna culture had sophisticated religious beliefs about the afterlife and developed hierarchical status differences. It has the oldest known burial evidence of an elite male. Some authors have described the Varna elite males as 'kings'. The end of the fifth millennium BC is the time that Marija Gimbutas, founder of the Kurgan hypothesis claims the cultural advance to male dominance began in Europe. The high status male was buried with remarkable amounts of gold, held a war axe or mace and wore a gold penis sheath. The bull-shaped gold platelets perhaps also venerated virility, instinctive force, and warfare.

Gallery

See also 

 Early European Farmers
 Old Europe (archaeology)
 Boian culture
 Butmir Culture
 Cucuteni–Trypillia culture
 Funnelbeaker culture
 Hamangia culture
 Karanovo culture
 Lengyel culture
 Linear Pottery culture
 Sesklo culture
 Solnitsata
 Starčevo culture
 Tisza culture
 Vinča culture
 Vinča symbols
 Carnac Stones - Tumuli

References

Further reading 

 Henrieta Todorova, The eneolithic period in Bulgaria in the fifth millennium B.C. Oxford : British Archaeological Reports, 1978. BAR supplementary series 49.
 Henrieta Todorova, Kupferzeitliche Siedlungen in Nordostbulgarien. München: Beck 1982. Materialien zur allgemeinen und vergleichenden Archäologie  13.

External links 

 Varna Archaeological Museum.
 Varna Necropolis Cultural Tourism page on the Golden Sands Resort web site.
 Another photo by Ivo Hadjimishev
 The Durankulak Lake Town - Kibela's Temple (Древното селище при Дуранкулашкото езеро - Езерният град)
 Very detailed information about findings in Varna necropolis I and II (founded in 1972 and 1976) - in Bulgarian language 

5th-millennium BC establishments
5th-millennium BC disestablishments
Archaeological cultures in Bulgaria
History of Varna, Bulgaria
Neolithic cultures of Europe
European civilizations